Saida Muna Tasneem is a Bangladeshi diplomat who has served as High Commissioner of Bangladesh to the United Kingdom and Ambassador to Ireland and Liberia since November 2018.  She is the first woman to hold these positions.  She also serves as Bangladesh's permanent representative to the International Maritime Organization (IMO). She was formerly the High Commissioner to Thailand and Cambodia and Bangladesh's representative to the United Nations Economic and Social Commission for Asia and the Pacific.

Biography

Saida Muna Tasneem was born in Dhaka, East Pakistan. Her family moved to Beirut, Lebanon in 1975 in order for her father to complete his Ph.D at the American University of Beirut. They later moved back to Dhaka in 1979 where Tasneem completed high school at the Holy Cross Girls' High School. She attended the Bangladesh University of Engineering and Technology and graduated in 1988 with a Bachelors of Science in Chemical Engineering. Her father, a public servant, encouraged her to take the BCS Examinations, in which she excelled. She later completed her Master of Science degree in public policy and management at the University of London's School of Oriental and African Studies.

Career

Tasneem began working with the Bangladesh Foreign Service in 1993.

The Bangladeshi Ministry of Foreign Affairs recalled Tasneem from her posting to Bangladesh's United Nations mission in June 2004.

Ambassador to Thailand and Cambodia

Tasneem was appointed as the Ambassador for Bangladesh to Thailand and Cambodia on November 14, 2014. She met with then-Crown Prince Maha Vajiralongkorn, representing King Rama IX, on September 4, 2015, to present her credentials.

As Ambassador, it was one of Tasneem's priorities to strengthen religious tourism between the two countries.
Md Nazmul Quaunine took over for Tasneem as the High Commissioner to Thailand on October 23, 2018.

High Commissioner to the United Kingdom, and Ambassador to Ireland and Liberia

On November 30, 2018, Tasneem was appointed as the 20th High Commissioner to the United Kingdom, and Ambassador to Ireland and Liberia, succeeding Md Nazmul Quaunine. She became the first woman appointed to the position.

On May 1, 2019, Tasneem attended a reception at Buckingham Palace, where she presented Quaunine's letter of recall and her letter of credence to Queen Elizabeth II. During the meeting, Tasneem wished the Queen for good health and prosperity, and made the request for two forests in Bangladesh (one of which being Lauachhora forest) to be included under the Queen's Commonwealth Canopy — while the Queen praised Bangladesh's economic growth and women empowerment.

On November 21, 2019, Tasneem met with Irish president Michael D. Higgins at the Áras an Uachtaráin in Dublin, Ireland. Tasneem thanked Higgins for his support of Bangladeshi diaspora within Ireland, while Higgins professed his admiration of Prime Minister Sheikh Hasina sheltering of 1.1 million Rohingya refugees from neighbouring Myanmar. She also openly invited Higgins to open an Irish embassy in Dhaka and to frequently hold bilateral talks to improve relations.

United Nations

In 2014, Tasneem was appointed as Bangladesh's permanent representative to the United Nations Economic and Social Commission for Asia and the Pacific (UNESCAP). At the 72nd session of the commission in May 2016, she helped table a resolution titled "Regional cooperation in Asia and the Pacific to promote the conservation and sustainable use of the oceans, seas and marine resources for sustainable development", that was co-sponsored by Australia, India, and Sri Lanka, based upon Sheikh Hasina's blue economy policies. The resolution passed unanimously.

Tasneem is also Bangladesh's representative to the International Maritime Organization.

Awards

 On February 23, 2017, at a ceremony in Dhaka, Tasneem was awarded the Atish Dipankar Peace Gold Award from deputy speaker Fazle Rabbi Miah. She received the award in recognition of her work to promote interfaith dialogue and peace, particularly during her role as High Commissioner to Thailand.
 Diplomat of the Year 2022 Award

References

Living people
People from Dhaka
Bangladesh University of Engineering and Technology alumni
Alumni of the University of London
Ambassadors of Bangladesh to Thailand
Ambassadors of Bangladesh to Ireland
Ambassadors of Bangladesh to Liberia
High Commissioners of Bangladesh to the United Kingdom
Bangladeshi women ambassadors
Year of birth missing (living people)
Date of birth missing (living people)